The 1973 Oakland Athletics season involved the A's winning their third consecutive American League West title with a record of 94 wins and 68 losses. The A's went on to defeat the Baltimore Orioles in the ALCS for their second straight AL Championship, and won the World Series in seven games over the New York Mets to take their second consecutive World Championship.

Offseason 
 November 24, 1972: Matty Alou was traded by the Athletics to the New York Yankees for Rob Gardner and a player to be named later. The Yankees completed the deal by sending Rich McKinney to the Athletics on December 1.
 November 30, 1972: Mike Epstein was traded by the Athletics to the Texas Rangers for Horacio Piña.
 December 18, 1972: Orlando Cepeda was released by the Athletics.
 January 10, 1973: 1973 Major League Baseball Draft (January Draft) notable picks:
Round 1: Mike Norris (24th pick).
Secondary Phase
Round 1: Warren Cromartie (10th pick) (did not sign).
 January 23, 1973: Jerry McNertney was signed as a free agent by the Athletics.
 March 24, 1973: Dave Duncan and George Hendrick were traded by the Athletics to the Cleveland Indians for Ray Fosse and Jack Heidemann.
 March 31, 1973: Jay Johnstone signed as a free agent with the Athletics.

Regular season 
The 1973 A's had three 20-game winners in Jim (Catfish) Hunter, Ken Holtzman and Vida Blue.

The A's were on the receiving end of some milestones as well. On July 3, Nolan Ryan struck out Sal Bando of the Athletics for the 1000th strikeout in his career. On July 30,  Jim Bibby threw the first no-hitter in Texas Rangers history as he no-hit the Athletics. The Rangers won the game 6–0.

Opening Day starters 
 Billy North, DH
 Dal Maxvill, SS
 Joe Rudi, LF
 Reggie Jackson, RF
 Sal Bando, 3B
 Gene Tenace, 1B
 Billy Conigliaro, CF
 Ray Fosse, C
 Dick Green, 2B
 Catfish Hunter, P

Season standings

Record vs. opponents

Notable transactions 
 April 3, 1973: Don Shaw was traded by the Athletics to the Detroit Tigers for Tim Hosley.
 May 4, 1973: Jerry McNertney was purchased from the Athletics by the Pittsburgh Pirates.
 May 11, 1973: Mark Budaska was signed as an amateur free agent by the Athletics.
 June 24, 1973: Steve McCatty was signed by the Athletics as an amateur free agent.
 July 7, 1973: Dal Maxvill was purchased from the Athletics by the Pittsburgh Pirates.
 July 31, 1973: Jesús Alou was purchased by the Athletics from the Houston Astros.
 August 29, 1973: Gonzalo Márquez was traded by the Athletics to the Chicago Cubs for Pat Bourque.
 September 11, 1973: Rico Carty was purchased by the Athletics from the Chicago Cubs.

Draft picks 
 June 5, 1973: 1973 Major League Baseball Draft
Floyd Bannister was drafted by the Athletics in the 3rd round, but did not sign.
Matt Keough was drafted by the Athletics in the 7th round.
Derek Bryant was drafted by the Athletics in the 8th round.
Craig Mitchell was drafted by the Athletics in the 1st round (1st pick) of the secondary phase.

Roster

Player stats

Batting

Starters by position 
Note: Pos = Position; G = Games played; AB = At bats; R = Runs scored; H = Hits; Avg. = Batting average; HR = Home runs; RBI = Runs batted in; SB = Stolen bases

Other batters 
Note: G = Games played; AB = At bats; R = Runs scored; H = Hits; Avg. = Batting average; HR = Home runs; RBI = Runs batted in; SB = Stolen bases

Pitching

Starting pitchers 
Note: G = Games pitched; IP = Innings pitched; W = Wins; L = Losses; ERA = Earned run average; BB = Bases on balls; SO = Strikeouts

Other pitchers 
Note: G = Games pitched; IP = Innings pitched; W = Wins; L = Losses; ERA = Earned run average; BB = Bases on balls; SO = Strikeouts

Relief pitchers 
Note: G = Games pitched; IP = Innings pitched; W = Wins; L = Losses; SV = Saves; ERA = Earned run average; BB = Bases on balls; SO = Strikeouts

Postseason

ALCS

Game 1 
October 6, 1973, at Memorial Stadium

In Game 1, the Orioles jumped on Oakland starter Vida Blue and reliever Horacio Piña for four runs in the bottom of the first inning. Jim Palmer pitched a 5-hit shutout as the Orioles won, 6–0.

Game 2 
October 7, 1973, at Memorial Stadium

In Game 2, the Athletics hit three home runs off Baltimore starter Dave McNally, and won 6–3 behind Catfish Hunter.

Game 3 
October 9, 1973, at Oakland-Alameda County Coliseum

In Game 3, the Athletics won 2–1 when shortstop Bert Campaneris homered to lead off the bottom of the 11th inning.

Game 4 
October 10, 1973, at Oakland-Alameda County Coliseum

In Game 4, the Athletics held a 4–0 lead after six innings, but the Orioles scored four in the seventh off Blue to tie the game; the key blow was a three-run home run by catcher Andy Etchebarren. Baltimore second baseman Bobby Grich broke the tie with a solo home run in the 8th inning, and the Orioles went on to win, 5–4.

Game 5 
October 11, 1973, at Oakland-Alameda County Coliseum

In Game 5, Hunter pitched a 5-hit shutout as the Athletics won, 3–0, and took the series 3 games to 2.

World Series 

The Athletics' victory over the New York Mets in the 1973 Series was marred by Charlie O. Finley's antics. Finley forced Mike Andrews to sign a false affidavit saying he was injured after the reserve second baseman committed two consecutive errors in the 12th inning of the A's Game Two loss to the Mets. This would allow Manny Trillo, ineligible because he was not a member of the team on Sep 1, to be activated.

By demeaning Mike Andrews, Finley brought on open rebellion, the logical progression for a team that has never deluded itself about being a happy ship. The A's worked out at Shea with Andrews' No. 17 taped to their uniforms as a sign of sympathy with him. By then he was back home in Peabody, Massachusetts. 
When other team members, manager Dick Williams, and virtually the entire viewing public rallied to Andrews' defense, commissioner Bowie Kuhn forced Finley to back down. Andrews entered Game 4 in the eighth inning as a pinch-hitter. As he walked to the on-deck circle the crowd of 54,817 at Shea Stadium spotted his No. 17 and commenced cheering. He promptly grounded out, and Finley ordered him benched for the remainder of the Series.

Andrews never played another major league game. Williams was so disgusted by the affair that he announced his resignation as manager while the series was still being played. Finley retaliated by vetoing Williams' attempt to become manager of the Yankees. Finley claimed that since Williams still owed Oakland the last year of his contract, he could not manage anywhere else. Finley relented later in 1974 and allowed Williams to take over as manager of the California Angels.

The A's won the World Series in seven games after rallying from a three games to two deficit.

Summary 
AL Oakland Athletics (4) vs. NL New York Mets (3)

Awards and honors 
 Bert Campaneris, Babe Ruth Award
 Reggie Jackson, OF, American League RBI Champion
 Reggie Jackson, OF, World Series Most Valuable Player Award

Farm system

References

External links
1973 Oakland Athletics team page at Baseball Reference
1973 Oakland Athletics team page at www.baseball-almanac.com

Oakland Athletics seasons
Oakland Athletics season
American League West champion seasons
American League champion seasons
World Series champion seasons
Oakland